Jacob Albert "Doc" Hines (May 1, 1927 – March 3, 2020) was an American politician, veterinarian, and beef farmer.

Hines was born in West Salem, Ohio on May 1, 1927, and graduated from Homer High School in Homerville, Ohio. Hines served in the U.S. Army from 1945 to 1947 before returning to attended college. He received a Doctor of Veterinary Medicine from Ohio State University in 1953.

Hines moved to Oxford, Wisconsin, where he worked as a veterinarian and beef farmer.  He served on the school board for the Westfield School District from 1969 to 1981. He was elected to the Wisconsin State Assembly in 2001 special election. He won re-election in 2002, 2004, and 2006. He was defeated in the 2008 election by Democrat Fred Clark.

Hines retired from his veterinary practice in 2004. In 2012, Hines moved to Texas and died there at the age of 92 on March 3, 2020.

References

1927 births
Farmers from Wisconsin
2020 deaths
Republican Party members of the Wisconsin State Assembly
People from West Salem, Ohio
People from Marquette County, Wisconsin
United States Army soldiers
American veterinarians
Male veterinarians
21st-century American politicians
Ohio State University College of Veterinary Medicine alumni